Highway  is an Indian Bengali romantic film, directed by Sudipto Chattopadhyay and produced under the banner of Surinder Films. The film features actors Koel Mallick and Parambrata Chatterjee in the lead roles. Music of the film has been composed by Anupam Roy. This film was released on 8 August 2014.

Plot 
The story of the film revolves around the life of two people, who come across each other on a highway, which takes a very significant position in their life, being the witness of all their ups and downs. Their love story takes various twists and turns.

Koel and Parambrata are playing the role of an unhappy couple in this film, who could not bridge the gap between themselves even after trying for long. Koel's role is that of a Bengali girl while Parambrata plays a non-Bengali guy. Though their marriage was a love marriage, they realise that there was a vacancy in their life. The way they overcome that vacancy and discover each other from a new point of view, forms the climax of the story.

Cast 
 Parambrata Chatterjee as Ashwin "Win" Kapoor
 Koel Mallick as Sohini Dasgupta
 Silajit Majumder as Firdous Aga
 Deepankar De
 Sabitri Chatterjee 
 Rita Dutta Chakraborty as Pritha
 Gaurav Chakrabarty as Dhruba (extended cameo)

Production

Development 
Surinder Films, the production house of Nispal Singh Rane (Koel Mallick's husband), will be financing this film. This film also marks the Bengali directorial debut of Sudipto Chattopadhyay of Shobhana 7 Nights and Pankh fame. The film was earlier titled Aparichito, which later changed to Highway.

Casting 
Actress Koel Mallick was signed to play the female lead opposite Parambrata Chatterjee, which is their second pairing after Hemlock Society. Her character is that of a psychologically affected woman, whose father died while she was in 9th Standard. Regarding her role, she said, "It has Parambrata and me and once again we play characters that are completely opposite to each other but I wouldn't compare it to a Hemlock Society." Because of being preoccupied with this film, she rejected the offer of being cast as the female lead in Aniruddha Roy Chowdhury's Buno Haansh, opposite Dev. Actor Gaurav Chakrabarty plays the character of a rockstar in this film.

Filming 
Filming locations include the picturesque hill station of Darjeeling in West Bengal. Shooting was delayed a bit due to excessive downpours during the crew's stay at Darjeeling.

Soundtrack 
Anupam Roy roped in to compose the film score for Highway. Lyrics will also be penned by him.

References 

2014 films
Bengali-language Indian films
2010s Bengali-language films
Films scored by Anupam Roy